The WTA Fan Favorite Awards are a series of annual Women's Tennis Association (WTA) awards given since the 2009 WTA Tour to those who receive the most votes from the fans of the WTA Tour.

Fan Favorite Singles Player of the Year

Fan Favorite Doubles Team of the Year

* — In 2015, this award was titled Womance of the Year

WTA Shot of the Year

Fan Favorite WTA Match of the Year

Fan Favorite Grand Slam Match of the Year

Fan Favorite Tournament

Fan Favorite Social Media

References

http://www.wtatennis.com/scontent/article/3010014/title/wta-awards

WTA Awards